Fresh Express may refer to:

 FreshXpress, a UK supermarket chain
 Fresh Express, a fresh salad subsidiary of Chiquita Brands International
 Ellie Mae Classic, or Fresh Express Classic, a golf tournament in Hayward, California, U.S.

See also
 Fresh expression, a movement in the Christian church